The Saint Vincent and the Grenadines women's national rugby union team are a national sporting side of Saint Vincent and the Grenadines, representing them at rugby union. The side first played in 2009.

History

Results summary
(Full internationals only)

Results

Full internationals

See also
 Rugby union in Saint Vincent and the Grenadines

External links
 Saint Vincent and the Grenadines on IRB.com

Caribbean women's national rugby union teams
Rugby union in Saint Vincent and the Grenadines
Rugby union